Isopedella is a genus of huntsman spiders that was first described by D. B. Hirst in 1990.

Species
 it contains eighteen species, all from Australia except for Isopedella terangana, found on the Aru Islands of eastern Indonesia:
Isopedella ambathala Hirst, 1993 – Australia (Queensland, South Australia)
Isopedella cana (Simon, 1908) – Australia (Western Australia, South Australia)
Isopedella castanea Hirst, 1993 – Australia (Western Australia)
Isopedella cerina Hirst, 1993 – Australia (Queensland)
Isopedella cerussata (Simon, 1908) – Australia
Isopedella conspersa (L. Koch, 1875) – Australia (Queensland, Northern Territory)
Isopedella flavida (L. Koch, 1875) – Australia (Queensland, New South Wales)
Isopedella frenchi (Hogg, 1903) – Australia (Victoria, South Australia)
Isopedella gibsandi Hirst, 1993 – Australia (Western Australia)
Isopedella inola (Strand, 1913) – Australia
Isopedella leai (Hogg, 1903) – Australia (South Australia)
Isopedella maculosa Hirst, 1993 – Australia (Western Australia)
Isopedella meraukensis (Chrysanthus, 1965) – New Guinea, Australia (Queensland, Northern Territory)
Isopedella pessleri (Thorell, 1870) (type) – Australia (New South Wales, Victoria)
Isopedella saundersi (Hogg, 1903) – Australia
Isopedella terangana (Strand, 1911) – Indonesia (Aru Is.)
Isopedella tindalei Hirst, 1993 – Australia
Isopedella victorialis Hirst, 1993 – Australia (Victoria)

See also
 List of Sparassidae species

References

Araneomorphae genera
Sparassidae
Spiders of Australia
Spiders of Indonesia